Anthorn Radio Station is a naval and government radio transmitting station located near Anthorn, Cumbria, England, overlooking the Solway Firth, and is operated by Babcock International (with whom former operators VT Communications are now merged). It has three transmitters: one VLF; one LF; and an eLORAN transmitter.

It is on the site of the World War II military airfield which was operated by the Fleet Air Arm as HMS Nuthatch.

RNAS Anthorn

John Laing & Son began building an airfield at Anthorn for the Fleet Air Arm in late 1943, and Royal Naval Air Station, Anthorn, was commissioned as HMS Nuthatch on 7 September 1944, with three tarmacadam runways. It was the base of No. 1 Aircraft Receipt and Despatch Unit (No. 1 ARDU), which had the job of receiving aircraft fresh from manufacturers, modifying them to Service standards and despatching them to operational squadrons, with the unit specialising in the Vought F4U Corsair, Supermarine Seafire, Fairey Barracuda and Fairey Firefly types.
No. 1 ARDU continued to operate from Anthorn following the end of the Second World War, while a number of Fleet Air Arm Squadrons were also based at the airfield in the immediate post war years. The airbase shut down in March 1958. The present road to Cardurnock runs partially along the airfield perimeter track. Several firing butts, for synchronising aircraft machine guns, can still be seen on the seaward side of the road.

VLF transmitter

The VLF transmitter is used primarily for transmitting orders to submarines and transmits on 19.6 kHz with an output power of 550 kilowatts.  Its callsign is GQD. VLF transmissions are relatively unaffected by atmospheric nuclear explosions and Anthorn was once part of the link between Fylingdales early warning radar, North Yorkshire, and the United States' air defence system.

A large part of the site is taken up by the VLF transmitter's large trideco wire umbrella antenna.   This consists of a  central mast with 6 vertical wire radiators suspended from its top fed at the base of the mast, attached to 6 rhombic-shaped 2148 ft long horizontal multiwire toploads which radiate from the central mast at angles of 60°, supported by 12 surrounding masts, giving the antenna the shape of a 6-pointed star when seen from above.  The cables supporting the endpoints of the wire antenna carry a load of 31 tons and are attached to computer controlled winches which automatically adjust the tension.   The high voltage of several hundred kilovolts on the topload wires during transmission requires long strings of insulators where the wires are attached to the towers. 

It is a NATO facility, controlled from Northwood Headquarters along with three other VLF transmitters in Norway, Germany and Italy. In accordance with the procedure for NATO projects, the project was the subject of a competition among the organisation's member countries. The British Post Office, acting as technical adviser and agent of the Ministry of Defence, chose the site, negotiated the contract and supervised the work, with the assistance of the Ministry of Public Building and Works. The contract was placed on 26 October 1961 with Continental Electronics Systems Incorporated of Dallas, Texas. This firm had already built a similar but much larger station in Maine, USA. Work began in 1962 and the station was accepted on behalf of the MoD in November 1964.

Originally, the station was designed to radiate a single telegraph channel at up to 45.5 baud and at powers ranging from 50 kW at 16 kHz to 100 kW at 20 kHz. The carrier frequency was to be stable to one part in 108 over a month. Subsequently, the data rate was increased to 50 baud and the carrier stability improved.

LF transmitter: National Physical Laboratory time signal

The National Physical Laboratory (NPL) has installed three atomic clocks at Anthorn, and on 27 February 2007 Britain’s national time signal transmissions, retaining their original call sign of MSF, were transferred there on a trial basis, moving formally on 1 April 2007. The signals were previously transmitted from a transmitter at Rugby, administered by BT. The data transmitted includes time and date information which can be decoded using readily available software, and the signals are transmitted at an accurate frequency of 60 kHz to provide a national frequency standard.. The transmitting aerial uses an auxiliary mast adjacent to the VLF array.

Monitoring and logging of the clocks and control of the transmissions is by Internet link from the NPL offices at Teddington, using comparison with GPS signals at both locations. Signal monitoring is by radio. To ensure accuracy, dynamic adjustment of the aerial according to local conditions (such as wind distortion) is controlled from computers on site. The effective radiated power is 17 kW.

LORAN
The general lighthouse authorities for Britain and Ireland have contracted VT Communications to develop eLORAN (enhanced LORAN) radio navigational aid for mariners. The transmitter is at Anthorn. The transmitting aerial uses an auxiliary mast adjacent to the VLF array. Due to the closure of the eLORAN service in Germany and Norway the eLORAN service was discontinued on 31 December 2015. However, the eLoran timing signal is still active to allow for research and support purposes.

See also

 Rugby radio station

References

Sources

External links
 Russell W. Barnes' page about the wartime history
 Pictures of Anthorn
 Information on MSF relocation to Anthorn
 Press release about MSF relocation to Anthorn 
 The Transmission Gallery: Anthorn

Buildings and structures in Cumbria
Transmitter sites in England
Time signal radio stations
NATO installations in the United Kingdom
Military installations in England
LORAN-C transmitters
Military history of Cumbria